Patricia June Thorburn Smith (8 June 1931 – 4 November 1967) was a popular English actress whose career was cut short by her death in an air crash.

Early life
Thorburn was born in Karachi, then part of British India. She was the eldest of three children, including her sister Diana and her brother Keith. She spent most of her schooldays in boarding schools in India, since her father was a colonel in the Indian Army and therefore her parents travelled a lot. When he retired from the military, they moved back to Britain.

The 1956 edition of 'Picture Show Who's Who on The Screen', (page 147), made the claim that she was a child "Skiing champion".
 
June began writing plays from about the age of seven. Her grandfather (Sydney Thorburn) who had also spent many years in India as a design engineer, building many important bridges, made early 'movies' and she was the star in several, the first being "Her Second Birthday", when she was only two years old.

Family
When she was 20 she left home and moved to London to pursue her career, where she met and married her first husband, Aldon Richard Bryse-Harvey. During their short and stressful marriage, she bore one daughter in 1953, named Heather-Louise June. The marriage ended in divorce and June moved back to Hampshire, close to her family, for a couple of years until her career started to take off.

In 1957, she moved back to London, where shortly thereafter she met Morten Smith-Petersen, who subsequently became her second husband. She was married to him until her death in 1967. Together with Morten, she had a second daughter named Inger-Sheleen Christabel.

Career
She appeared in her first commercial film in 1952, and quickly worked her way up from supporting roles to second female leads. One of her most notable roles in the mid-1950s was in the comedy-drama Touch and Go (1955), starring Jack Hawkins. Thorburn began to win leading roles, in British comedies such as True as a Turtle (1957) and costume dramas such as Fury at Smugglers' Bay (1961) and The Scarlet Blade (1963). Her most notable film appearance was as the Forest Queen in Tom Thumb (1958). During the early 1960s, she also appeared regularly on British television.

Death
She was pregnant with her third child when returning to London from Spain on Iberia Flight 062 when it crashed at Blackdown, Sussex, killing all 37 people on board.

Filmography

Film

Television

References

External links
 
 June Thorburn timeline with citations
 Blackdown air crash
 

1931 births
1967 deaths
English television actresses
Victims of aviation accidents or incidents in England
Victims of aviation accidents or incidents in 1967
Actresses from Karachi
20th-century British actresses
20th-century English women
20th-century English people